This is a list of museums in Barbados.

Museums in Barbados 

 Arlington House Museum
 Barbados Museum & Historical Society
 Cricket Legends of Barbados
 George Washington House
 Nidhe Israel Synagogue
 Museum of Parliament & National Heroes Gallery
 Sir Frank Hutson Sugar Museum
 Springvale Indigenous Folk Museum & Eco-Heritage

See also 
 List of museums
 List of archives in Barbados

External links 	

Museums
 
Museums
Barbados
Museums